Come Spy with Me may refer to:

Come Spy with Me (film), a 1967 American film
"Come Spy with Me" (The Miracles song), 1967 title song of the film
Come Spy with Me, a 1966 West End musical by Bryan Blackburn; see List of musicals by composer: A to L
"Come Spy with Me", a 1966 recording of the film music by Hugo Montenegro and His Orchestra on his album Come Spy with Me
"Come Spy with Me", an episode of Wow! Wow! Wubbzy!